Shin Ha-kyun (born May 30, 1974) is a South Korean actor. He is known for his roles in television series Brain (2011), Soul Mechanic (2020), Beyond Evil (2021), and films Joint Security Area (2000), Sympathy for Mr. Vengeance (2002), Save the Green Planet! (2003), Welcome to Dongmakgol (2005), Empire of Lust (2015), and Less Than Evil (2019).

Career
Shin Ha-kyun first trained as a stage actor at the Seoul Institute of the Arts before going on to act in a large number of plays by Jang Jin. When in 1998 Jang Jin directed his first movie The Happenings, Shin was cast and he has since appeared in almost all of Jang's feature films. Impressed by his acting abilities, director Kim Jee-woon also cast him in minor roles in The Foul King and his 30-minute internet film Coming Out.

Shin first became a superstar with his role as a young North Korea soldier in Park Chan-wook's smash hit Joint Security Area in late 2000. At that time he developed a large fan following which, together that of co-star Won Bin, helped make his next film Guns & Talks a strong commercial hit.

In the next couple years Shin would take on two strong roles that would come to define his career. In Park Chan-wook's acclaimed Sympathy for Mr. Vengeance, he played a deaf man with bright green dyed hair who is driven by desperation to kidnap a young girl. Then in Jang Joon-hwan's Save the Green Planet! in 2003, he played a mentally unbalanced man who believes that aliens are plotting to invade the earth. Together, these two intense and harrowing performances by Shin were an impressive display of his acting talent.

Also noteworthy are Shin's performances in two very different films set during the Korean War -- Welcome to Dongmakgol, a dramedy that takes place in a small mountainous village, and The Front Line, a harrowing tale of soldiers fighting over a small, bomb-blasted hill that regularly changes hands. The versatile actor has played the following roles: a developmentally disabled man in My Brother, a rural postman in A Letter From Mars, a suspect under interrogation in Murder, Take One, an eccentric hitman in No Mercy for the Rude, a struggling artist who makes an unwise bet in The Devil's Game, a sickly cuckolded husband in Thirst, a macho cop in Foxy Festival, and a music teacher having an affair in Cafe Noir.

Primarily a film actor, Shin had previously done only one TV series, 2003's Good Person on MBC. But in 2010 he returned to television in the quirky mystery Golden House which aired on cable channel tvN. Then in the 2011 medical drama Brain, his portrayal of a cold, ambitious neurosurgeon brought him to new heights of mainstream popularity, and he later won the Grand Prize ("Daesang") at the KBS Drama Awards.

In 2013, Shin headlined the romantic comedy series All About My Romance about two legislators from rival political parties who fall in love, followed by the high-profile action film Running Man about an ordinary man forced to become a fugitive after he gets framed for murder.

He then played a septuagenarian whose body magically reverts to his thirties in the 2014 romantic comedy series Mr. Back. Shin next gave a villainous turn as an evil mastermind game planner in the action-thriller Big Match. In 2015, he headlined his first period film with Empire of Lust, playing a distinguished admiral of the recently established Joseon empire.

In 2016, Shin starred in the police procedural crime drama Piped Piper (2016), playing a negotiator. He then starred in the comedy film Detour, followed with comedy thriller Room No.7. He also played a supporting role in the action film The Villainess co-starring Kim Ok-bin.

In 2018, Shin starred in the romantic comedy film What a Man Wants.  The same year, he was cast in the comedy film Inseparable Bros. He returned to the small screen in the Korean remake of British crime drama Luther.

In 2020, Shin starred in the medical drama Soul Mechanic.

In 2021, Shin starred in the psychological thriller drama Beyond Evil as an impulsive and eccentric police officer. His performance earned him the award for the Best Actor - Television at 57th Baeksang Arts Awards.

In 2022, he appeared in the mystery-thriller film Anchor and will star in the Coupang Play sitcom Unicorn, which is scheduled to air on August.

Personal life
His niece, Park Eun-young, is a former member of the Korean idol group Brave Girls.

Shin and Kim Go-eun reportedly grew close at a scuba-diving gathering. In August 2016, they confirmed their couple of months relationship. However in March 2017, the couple announced their break up.

Filmography

Film

Television series

Web series

Theater

Music video appearances

Discography

Awards and nominations

State honors

Notes

References

External links 
 
 
 

South Korean male film actors
South Korean male television actors
South Korean male stage actors
Male actors from Seoul
1974 births
Living people
Seoul Institute of the Arts alumni
20th-century South Korean male actors
21st-century South Korean male actors
South Korean Buddhists